The sixth edition of the Men's Asian Amateur Boxing Championships was held from 3 to 9 May 1973 in Bangkok, Thailand.

Medal summary

Medal table

References

External links
Finals
Asian Boxing Confederation

Asian Amateur Boxing Championships
Asian Boxing
Boxing
1973 Asia